Dick Neal is the name of:

Dick Neal Sr. (1906–1986), English footballer
Dick Neal Jr. (1933–2013), his son and fellow footballer

See also
Richard Neal (disambiguation)